Julie J. Vargas (born 1968/1969) is an American attorney and jurist serving as a justice of the New Mexico Supreme Court since 2021. She is a former judge of the New Mexico Court of Appeals.

Early life and education 

Vargas was born and raised in Old Town Albuquerque. She earned a Bachelor of Arts degree in history and English literature from Brown University and her Juris Doctor from the University of New Mexico School of Law.

Career 

Vargas worked in private practice, serving more than 20 years at the Albuquerque law firm Hunt & Davis. Since 2018 she has been an adjunct professor at the University of New Mexico School of Law.

Judicial career

New Mexico Court of Appeals 

Vargas was one of three candidates sent to Governor Susana Martinez to fill the vacancy left by Cynthia Frye who retired in December 2015. Vargas was elected to the New Mexico Court of Appeals in 2016.

New Mexico Supreme Court 

On December 19, 2020, Governor Michelle Lujan Grisham announced her appointment of Vargas to be a justice of the New Mexico Supreme Court to fill the vacancy left by Justice Judith Nakamura who retired on December 1, 2020. She was sworn into office on January 25, 2021.

References

External links 

1960s births
Living people
20th-century American women lawyers
20th-century American lawyers
21st-century American judges
21st-century American women lawyers
21st-century American lawyers
American women academics
Brown University alumni
Hispanic and Latino American judges
Justices of the New Mexico Supreme Court
New Mexico state court judges
People from Albuquerque, New Mexico
University of New Mexico faculty
University of New Mexico School of Law alumni
21st-century American women judges